Linton Sirait (born 1956) is an Indonesian District Court judge in Bali. He is a Batak Christian from Medan in Sumatra.

As of 2005, out of 500 defendants facing drugs charges before him, not one was acquitted.

References

1956 births
People of Batak descent
21st-century Indonesian judges
Indonesian Lutherans
People from Medan
Living people